The 1982 Chicago Cubs season was the 111th season of the Chicago Cubs franchise, the 107th in the National League and the 67th at Wrigley Field. The Cubs finished fifth in the National League East with a record of 73-89, 19 games behind the eventual National League and 1982 World Series Champion St. Louis Cardinals. For the first time in more than a half a century, the Cubs were not owned by a member of the Wrigley family. Instead, it was the first full season for the Cubs under the ownership of the Tribune Company, owners of the team's broadcast partner WGN TV and Radio, and for Cubs TV viewers the first season ever for them to see and hear Harry Caray on the broadcast panel.

Offseason 
November 15, 1981: Steve Macko, a promising prospect passes away after a short bout with testicular cancer. 
 December 8, 1981: Mike Krukow and cash were traded by the Cubs to the Philadelphia Phillies for Dickie Noles, Dan Larson and Keith Moreland.
 December 28, 1981: The Cubs traded a player to be named later to the Toronto Blue Jays for Paul Mirabella. The Cubs completed the deal by sending Dave Geisel to the Blue Jays on March 25.
 January 27, 1982: Iván DeJesús was traded by the Cubs to the Philadelphia Phillies for Larry Bowa and Ryne Sandberg.
 March 15, 1982: Mike Tyson was released by the Chicago Cubs.
 March 26, 1982: Paul Mirabella, a player to be named later, and cash were traded by the Cubs to the Texas Rangers for Bump Wills. The Cubs completed the trade by sending Paul Semall (minors) to the Rangers on April 21.

Regular season

Season standings

Record vs. opponents

Notable transactions 
 April 1, 1982: Bill Caudill was sent by the Cubs to the New York Yankees to partially complete an earlier deal (the Chicago Cubs sent players to be named later to the Yankees for Pat Tabler) made on August 19, 1981.
 April 9, 1982: Randy Stein was signed as a free agent by the Cubs.
 June 7, 1982: Gary Varsho was drafted by the Cubs in the 5th round of the 1982 Major League Baseball Draft. Player signed June 12, 1982.
 August 2, 1982: The Chicago Cubs sent Jay Howell to the New York Yankees to complete the August 19, 1981, trade noted above.

Roster

Player stats

Batting

Starters by position 
Note: Pos = Position; G = Games played; AB = At bats; H = Hits; Avg. = Batting average; HR = Home runs; RBI = Runs batted in

Other batters 
Note: G = Games played; AB = At bats; H = Hits; Avg. = Batting average; HR = Home runs; RBI = Runs batted in

Pitching

Starting pitchers 
Note: G = Games pitched; IP = Innings pitched; W = Wins; L = Losses; ERA = Earned run average; SO = Strikeouts

Other pitchers 
Note: G = Games pitched; IP = Innings pitched; W = Wins; L = Losses; ERA = Earned run average; SO = Strikeouts

Relief pitchers 
Note: G = Games pitched; W = Wins; L = Losses; SV = Saves; ERA = Earned run average; SO = Strikeouts

Farm system

Notes

References 
1982 Chicago Cubs season at Baseball Reference

Chicago Cubs seasons
Chicago Cubs season
Chicago